Joseph Smith, founder of the Latter Day Saint movement, is viewed by the movement's adherents as a prophet in the tradition of the ancient prophets recorded in the Bible. During his life, Smith made several prophecies, many documented in the Doctrine and Covenants, a book of scripture in several of the movement's denominations.

There is much dispute surrounding the known and alleged prophecies of Smith. Some critics contend that Smith could not be a genuine prophet because they claim that some of his prophecies did not come true. Latter Day Saint adherents have responded to these claims by putting forth the following six arguments:

some prophecies that critics claim have failed have actually been fulfilled;
some of Smith's statements have been mischaracterized as "prophecies";
some prophetic statements ascribed to Smith have not been verified as legitimate by either Latter Day Saint or non–Latter Day Saint historians;
some prophecies should be interpreted metaphorically, not literally;
some legitimate prophecies were conditional and did not happen because the conditions precedent to those prophesies were not satisfied; and
some legitimate prophecies remain unfulfilled but are expected to be fulfilled in the future.

Table of prophecies organized by date

Prophecies from 1823 to 1830

Prophecies from 1831 to 1832

Prophecies from 1833 to 1834

Prophecies from 1835 to 1839

Prophecies from 1840 to 1844

See also
 List of non-canonical revelations in the Church of Jesus Christ of Latter Day Saints
 Miracles of Joseph Smith
 One Mighty and Strong

Notes

References

 
.
.
.
.
.
.
.
.

External links
Favorable
Doctrine and Covenants
"World of Abraham"
"Samples Of Prophecies Of Joseph Smith That Have Been Fulfilled" from FAIR
Fulfilled Prophecies of Joseph Smith
Joseph Smith Prophecies

Unfavorable
The False Prophet, Joseph Smith "And It Didn't Come to Pass..." by Ed Decker
Christian Apologetics & Research Ministry

Joseph Smith
Prophecies of Joseph Smith
Smith, Joseph